Kowli-ye Bayandor (also TURKMEN as Kowlī-ye Bāyandor) is a village in Zavkuh Rural District, Pishkamar District, Kalaleh County, Golestan Province, turkmen sahra, Iran. At the 2006 census, its population was 623, in 133 families.

References 

Populated places in Kalaleh County